F. Murray Abraham (born Murray Abraham; October 24, 1939) is an American actor. Known for his roles on stage and screen, he came to prominence for his acclaimed leading role as Antonio Salieri in the drama film Amadeus (1984) for which he won the Academy Award for Best Actor and the Golden Globe Award for Best Actor in a Motion Picture Drama as well as a BAFTA Award nomination.

Abraham made his Broadway debut in the 1968 play Man in the Glass Booth. He received the Obie Award for Outstanding Performance for his roles in Anton Chekhov's Uncle Vanya (1984) and William Shakespeare's The Merchant of Venice (2011). He returned to Broadway in the revival of Terrence McNally's comedy It's Only a Play (2014), receiving a Drama Desk Award for Outstanding Featured Actor in a Play nomination.

He has appeared in many roles, both leading and supporting, in films such as All the President's Men (1976), Scarface (1983), The Name of the Rose (1986), Last Action Hero (1993), Mighty Aphrodite (1995), Dillinger and Capone (1995), Star Trek: Insurrection (1998), Finding Forrester (2000), Inside Llewyn Davis (2013), The Grand Budapest Hotel (2014), Isle of Dogs (2018), and How to Train Your Dragon: The Hidden World (2019).

He was a regular cast member on the Showtime drama series Homeland (2012–2018), which earned him two nominations for the Primetime Emmy Award for Outstanding Guest Actor in a Drama Series. He also starred in Mythic Quest (2020–2021), Moon Knight (2022), and The White Lotus (2022), with the latter earning him a nomination for the Golden Globe Award for Best Supporting Actor in a Limited Series.

Early life
Abraham was born Murray Abraham on October 24, 1939, in Pittsburgh, Pennsylvania, the son of Fahrid "Fred" Abraham, an automotive mechanic, and his wife Josephine (née Stello) (April 15, 1915 – March 10, 2012), Murray has described himself as a Syrian-American. His father emigrated with his family from Muqlus, Ottoman Syria, a small village in the Valley of the Christians, at age five due to the famine of Mount Lebanon; his paternal grandfather was a priest in the Greek Orthodox Church of Antioch. His mother, one of 14 children, was Italian American, and the daughter of an Italian immigrant who worked in the coal mines of Western Pennsylvania. He had two younger brothers, Robert and Jack, who were killed in separate car accidents.

Abraham was raised in El Paso, Texas. Murray and his two younger brothers were altar boys in the St. George Antiochian Orthodox Church in El Paso. He attended Vilas Grammar School, and graduated from El Paso High School in 1958. He was a gang member during his teenage years. In El Paso, Abraham worked in the  factory owned by a Lebanese family before launching a career in acting. He attended Texas Western College (later named University of Texas at El Paso), where he was given the best actor award by Alpha Psi Omega for his portrayal of the Indian Nocona in Comanche Eagle during the 1959–60 season. He attended the University of Texas at Austin, then studied acting under Uta Hagen at HB Studio in New York City. He began his acting career on the stage, debuting in a Los Angeles production of Ray Bradbury's The Wonderful Ice Cream Suit.

Abraham added "F." to his stage name in honor of his father Fahrid. He has stated that "Murray Abraham just doesn't seem to say anything. It just is another name, so I thought I'd frame it".

Career

Film and television
Abraham made his screen debut as an usher in the George C. Scott comedy They Might Be Giants (1971). He can be seen as one of the undercover police officers along with Al Pacino in Sidney Lumet's Serpico (1973), and in television roles including the bad guy in one fourth-season episode of Kojak ("The Godson"). He played a cabdriver in the theatrical version of The Prisoner of Second Avenue (1975), a mechanic in the theatrical version of The Sunshine Boys (1975), and a police officer in the film All the President's Men (1976).

By the mid-1970s, he also had steady employment doing commercials and voice-overs. Most notably, he played "the leaf", one of four costumed characters, in television and print commercials for Fruit of the Loom underwear. In 1978, he gave up this work. Frustrated with the lack of substantial roles, he said: "No one was taking my acting seriously. I figured if I didn't do it, then I'd have no right to the dreams I've always had." His wife, Kate Hannan, went to work as an assistant and Abraham became a "house husband". As he described it: "I cooked and cleaned and took care of the kids. It was very rough on my macho idea of life. But it was the best thing that ever happened to me."

Abraham gained greater prominence when he appeared as drug dealer Omar Suárez in the gangster film Scarface (1983). Then, in 1984, he played envious composer Antonio Salieri in the Academy Award for Best Picture-winning Amadeus (1984), directed by Miloš Forman. Abraham won the Academy Award for Best Actor for his role, an award for which his co-star in the film Tom Hulce, playing Mozart, had also been nominated. He also won a Golden Globe Award, among other awards, and his role in the film remains his most iconic.

He next appeared in The Name of the Rose (1986), in which he played Bernardo Gui, nemesis to Sean Connery's William of Baskerville. In its DVD commentary, the director of the film, Jean-Jacques Annaud, described Abraham as an "egomaniac" on the set, who considered himself more important than Sean Connery because Connery did not have an Oscar. Despite the on-set tensions, the film was a critical and commercial success.

After the release of The Name of the Rose, Abraham tired of appearing as villains and wanted to return to his background in comedy. Over the next decade or so, Abraham had fewer prominent roles, but he did have substantial supporting roles in Peter Yates' An Innocent Man (1989), Woody Allen's Mighty Aphrodite (1995), Ahdar Ru'afo in Star Trek: Insurrection (1998), and Gus Van Sant's Finding Forrester (2000), where he again played the nemesis to Connery. He had a significant role in Brian De Palma's adaptation of The Bonfire of the Vanities (1990), but chose not to be credited due to a contract dispute. He continued his association with classical music by narrating the plot summaries of the operas of Wagner's Ring Cycle in the 1990 PBS broadcast from the Metropolitan Opera, to the largest viewing audience of the Ring Cycle in history, conducted by James Levine.

Abraham's relatively low-profile film career subsequent to his Academy Award win has been considered an example of the "Oscar jinx." According to film critic Leonard Maltin, professional failure following an early success is referred to in Hollywood circles as the "F. Murray Abraham syndrome." Abraham rejected this notion and told Maltin, "The Oscar is the single most important event of my career. I have dined with kings, shared equal billing with my idols, lectured at Harvard and Columbia. If this is a jinx, I'll take two." In the same interview, Abraham said, "Even though I won the Oscar, I can still take the subway in New York, and nobody recognizes me. Some actors might find that disconcerting, but I find it refreshing."

A 2009 guest appearance on Saving Grace began a new phase of Abraham's career, wherein he has become gradually more prolific onscreen. Further guest appearances include roles on Law & Order: Criminal Intent, Louie and Curb Your Enthusiasm as well as a recurring role on The Good Wife between 2011 and 2014. Additionally, Abraham was the primary narrator for the PBS series Nature between 2007 and 2010, narrating 32 episodes (plus one more in 2013). Abraham's most notable television role came about through Showtime's drama series Homeland, in which he portrayed black ops specialist Dar Adal. This role resulted in his first Emmy Award nomination in 2015, followed by a second in 2018.

In the 2010s, he featured prominently in two widely acclaimed films: first as folk music impresario Bud Grossman in the Coen brothers' drama Inside Llewyn Davis (2013), then as the mysterious Mr. Moustafa in Wes Anderson's The Grand Budapest Hotel (2014). More recently, he has voiced roles in Isle of Dogs (2018) and How to Train Your Dragon: The Hidden World (2019) and played Tony in the 2019 live-action Lady and the Tramp.

In February 2022, it was revealed that Abraham would be voicing Khonshu in the superhero limited series Moon Knight, set in the Marvel Cinematic Universe.

Theater

Since Amadeus, he has mainly focussed on classical theater, and has starred in many Shakespearean productions such as Othello and Richard III. He was highlighted in many other plays by the likes of Samuel Beckett and Gilbert and Sullivan, and played the lead in Anton Chekhov's Uncle Vanya (for which he received an Obie Award).

Abraham has focused on stage work throughout his career, giving notable performances as Pozzo in Mike Nichols's production of Waiting for Godot, Malvolio in Twelfth Night for the New York Shakespeare Festival, and Shylock in The Merchant of Venice for the Off-Broadway Theatre for a New Audience (TFANA) in March 2007, which was performed at the Duke Theater in New York and also at the Swan Theater, part of the Royal Shakespeare Company. He reprised this role in February 2011, when he replaced Al Pacino in the Public Theater's production. In the 1997/98 Broadway season, he starred in the new chamber musical Triumph of Love opposite Betty Buckley, based on Marivaux's classic comedy. The production did not find a large audience, running 85 performances after its pre-opening preview period. He has also taught theater at Brooklyn College. In 2016, he played the title role in Classic Stage Company's production of Nathan the Wise.

Abraham also joined The Mirror Theater Ltd's Mirror Repertory Company in 1984. He joined MRC the week after winning his Oscar for Best Actor for his work in Amadeus because he wanted to work with MRC Artist-in-Residence Geraldine Page (to whom he would eventually present her own Academy Award the following year), and would star opposite her in MRC's The Madwoman of Chaillot.

In 1994, Abraham portrayed Roy Cohn in the first Broadway production of Tony Kushner's Angels in America at the Walter Kerr Theater, replacing Ron Leibman in the role.

From May 10 through July 14, 1991, Abraham  portrayed King Lear in American Repertory Theater's (A.R.T.) production of King Lear, directed by Adrian Hall, Cambridge, MA.

Personal life
Abraham was married to Kate Hannan for 60 years (1962-2022) until her death on November 19, 2022. They have two children, Mick and Jamili, and one grandchild, Hannan.

In 1993, while filming the movie Surviving the Game in rural Washington state, Abraham was involved in a car crash in which another driver was killed, while Abraham was injured.

In January 2010, Abraham scuffled with a thief in the dressing room area during a public rehearsal at the Classic Stage Company in New York City.

Abraham has spoken about his faith: "I've attended many churches. I grew up as an Orthodox Christian and I was an altar boy. I love the Society of Friends, the Quakers. I attended their meetings for almost fifteen years. I'm now [in 2008] attending the First Presbyterian Church of New York because they're such a generous, terrific church with outreach. They reach out to old people, to homeless, to A.A., to cross-dressers: it's truly a church of the teachings of Christ. Religion is essential to my life."

Acting credits

Awards and honors

Abraham received an Academy Award and Golden Globe Award for his performance in Amadeus (1984). He also received a British Academy Film Award nomination for his performance. He has also received a Grammy Award, and two Primetime Emmy Award nominations. He has earned three Screen Actors Guild Award nominations with the ensemble casts of Homeland and The Grand Budapest Hotel (2014). He has earned two Obie Awards for his work in theater for his performances in Uncle Vanya (1984), and The Merchant of Venice (2011).

In July 2004, during a ceremony in Rome, he was awarded the "Premio per gli Italiani nel Mondo". This is a prize distributed by the Marzio Tremaglia foundation and the Italian government to Italian emigrants and their descendants who have distinguished themselves abroad. In 2009, he was recognized by the Alumni Association of the City College of New York with John H. Finley Award in recognition of exemplary dedicated service to the City of New York. In 2010, Abraham was the recipient of The Gielgud Award (Theater) for that year. In 2015, Abraham was an inductee to the American Theater Hall of Fame.
He also has an honorary doctorate from Rider University in Lawrenceville, New Jersey.

References

External links

 
 
 
 
 
 Yahoo! Movies Biography

1939 births
Living people
20th-century American male actors
21st-century American male actors
University of Texas at El Paso alumni
University of Texas at Austin alumni
Royal Shakespeare Company members
American male film actors
American male stage actors
American male television actors
American male Shakespearean actors
American people of Arab descent
American people of Italian descent
American people of Syrian descent
Male actors from Pittsburgh
Middle Eastern Christians
American Presbyterians
American Quakers
Best Actor Academy Award winners
Best Drama Actor Golden Globe (film) winners
Brooklyn College faculty
Obie Award recipients
Outstanding Performance by an Ensemble in a Drama Series Screen Actors Guild Award winners